He-Man and the Masters of the Universe is a computer-animated superhero television series developed by Rob David and is a reimagining of the 1983 series of the same name. The series premiered on Netflix on September 16, 2021. A second season was released on March 3, 2022. The third season was released on August 18, 2022.

Plot
On the planet Eternia, an amnesiac Prince Adam has been separated from his father King Randor during the treachery of his uncle Keldor. Upon being part of a Tiger Tribe with his best friend Krass'tine, Prince Adam later finds a Power Sword that transforms him into He-Man, the most powerful man in the universe. With Cringer, Krass'tine, and their new allies Teela and Duncan, known as Man-At-Arms, they work to fight the forces of Keldor upon his transformation into the evil Skeletor, and his minions Evil-Lyn, Beast Man, and Trap Jaw.

Voice cast

 Yuri Lowenthal as Prince Adam / He-Man and Tuvar
 Max Stubington as young Prince Adam
 Kimberly Brooks as Teela / Sorceress and Teela-Na / Eldress
 Judy Alice Lee as Krass'tine / Ram-Ma'am / Rampage
 David Kaye as Cringer / Battle Cat
 Antony Del Rio as Duncan / Man-at-Arms
 Benjamin Diskin as Keldor / Skeletor
 Roger Craig Smith as Kronis / Trap Jaw and General Dolos
 Grey Griffin as Evelyn / Evil-Lyn and Mo'squita-ra
 Trevor Devall as R'Qazz / Beast Man / Skele-Beast
 Fred Tatasciore as King Randor and Baddrah
 Tom Kenny as Ork-0 and various RK drones
 Zeno Robinson as King Stratos
 Stephen Fry as Man-E-Faces
 Bobcat Goldthwait as Gary the Dragonfly
 Dee Bradley Baker as Webstor
 Kevin Smith as Tri-Klops
 Stephanie Sheh as Justine, Tri-Klops' host
 Alan Oppenheimer as King Grayskull
 George Takei as Mer-Man
 Wallace Shawn as Orko the Great
 Kevin Conroy as Hordak
 Max Mitchell as Kitty

Episodes

Season 1 (2021)

Season 2 (2022)

Season 3 (2022)

Production 
On December 18, 2019, Netflix announced two new Masters of the Universe projects to be in development: an adult-oriented anime series described as a direct sequel to the 1983 He-Man and the Masters of the Universe television series titled Revelation, and a CGI series aimed at children. Pre-production was handled by House of Cool in Canada while animation services was done by CGCG Inc. in Taiwan.

Release
He-Man and the Masters of the Universe was released on September 16, 2021, on Netflix. A trailer was released on August 19. The second season was released on March 3, 2022. The third season was released on August 18, 2022.

Reception
The show has been received generally positive reviews from critics and fans alike. The review aggregator website Rotten Tomatoes reported a 80% approval rating with an average rating of 6.8/10, based on 5 critic reviews.

References

External links
House of Cool Inc. page

2020s American animated television series
2021 American television series debuts
2022 American television series endings
Masters of the Universe television series
English-language Netflix original programming
American animated science fantasy television series
American computer-animated television series
Animated space adventure television series
Television series by Mattel Creations
Animated television series reboots
Television series set on fictional planets
Animated television series by Netflix
Television shows based on Mattel toys